Brother John Charles Hamman S.M. (September 3, 1927 – December 5, 2000) was a close-up magician and Marianist Brother. The tricks he invented are still an integral part of many close-up magician's repertoire. Hamman was world-renowned in the magic community. His initial interest in the art started as a child. As he recuperated from polio, he spent hours learning, practicing and inventing card tricks and other magic involving sleight-of-hand. In many cases, he "reinvented" classic maneuvers or streamlined them. He was a member of the International Brotherhood of Magicians, the Catholic Magicians' Guild and the Society of American Magicians.

Career
Hamman created more than 100 card magic tricks throughout his career. Among the many tricks he invented, he is best known for the Hamman Count, a sleight-of-hand in which cards are falsely counted to give the impression that the magician holds more, or less, than he actually does. He authored many books and videos on magic and was invited to many local, national and international level (including FISM) magician gatherings to display his prowess and ability with cards. 

In 1995, Bro. Hamman was the first living magician to be honored during the first St. Louis Magical Heritage Awards, the "Hall of Fame" for local magicians. Professional magicians referred to Bro. Hamman as the "Magical Marianist." In his acceptance speech, Hamman explained the key to a successful magic performance:

His first major publication was "The Card Magic of Bro. John Hamman, S.M.," published by Paul LePaul in 1958. In his foreword, LePaul wrote,

Among magicians, Bro. Hamman is still known as a Magician's Magician. The highest honor the magic community can bestow on one of its own, it refers to one's ability to amaze even fellow conjurers. Despite this, his first love was doing magic for his students.

Bro. Hamman was also a skilled Gospel Magician. He frequently used his magic to teach some important aspect of Catholic catechism to his students.

Personal life 
Bro. Hamman was born in St. Louis, Missouri, to Godfrey and Olivia (née Ruoff) Hamman. He was one of two boys and a girl. The Loretto Sisters and Sisters of Saint Joseph taught him at St. Luke and St. Rose grade schools before he entered McBride High School in September, 1941. Influenced by Fr. John G. Leies and by his older brother Donald, who was already a Marianist candidate, the young John became a postulant at Maryhurst in 1942. He pronounced first vows at Marynook in Galesville, Wisconsin, on August 15, 1945, and final vows on July 10, 1951. In 1995 he celebrated the 50th anniversary of his religious profession as a Marianist.

Bro. Hamman earned a bachelor's degree in education from the University of Dayton in 1948 and an M.A. in English from St. Louis University in 1963. In the fall of 1948 he began his teaching career at Central Catholic Marianist High School in San Antonio, where he taught English. A year later he was assigned to St. Michael's High School in Chicago, where he stayed for two and a half years. In January, 1952 he was assigned to DeAndreis High School in St. Louis for the spring semester. Following this brief assignment, Brother John went to Coyle High School in August, 1952. Shortly thereafter, in October of the same year, he was diagnosed with a severe case of polio. He spent two years at Maryhurst recuperating.

Due to his illness, Bro. Hamman was only able to teach on a limited schedule. He was assigned to St. Mary's High School in 1954. After seven years, he returned to Central Catholic High School for a year before going to St. John Vianney High School in 1965. He was able to continue teaching there until he retired in 1986. Due to declining health and congestive heart failure, he was assigned to the Marianist Residence in San Antonio in 1995.

Death
Brother John Hamman died on December 5, 2000 at the St. Joseph Healthcare Center in San Antonio, Texas, at age 73. He is interred in the Marianist Cemetery on the campus of St. Mary's University in San Antonio. Brother John's personal letters, documents, poetry, and writings are held at the National Archives Marianist Province in San Antonio, Texas, close to St. Mary's University.

Famous quotes

Original magic tricks 

 1-2-3-4 Ascanio
 1-2-3-4 Mates 
 12345 Peek Thought 
 Acey-Deucy 
 Adventures of the Spotted 
 Alternative triplet 
 Amorphous Ace, The
 Axes and Jaxes, The
 Billy the Kid 
 Blind Chance 
 Blushing Joker
 Chameleon Blues 
 Chinese Shuffle 
 Computer Deck 
 Cream Rises to the Top 
 Deck in Parvo 
 Devilish Miracle Retold 
 Diminishing Card to Dollar 
 Disobedient Cards, The
 Do as I Do Aces 
 Double Take 
 Double-Deal Aces 
 Double-Deal Vanish 
 Eight Ball Queens 
 Fabulous Expanding Card 
 False Witness, The
 Fan-to-See 
 Final Aces 
 Five Kings Royal 
 Flash Poker 
 Flight of Four 
 Flip Flop Aces 
 Four Pocket Mirror 
 Four-tunate Choice 
 Go Fish 
 Hal-Deuce-Ination 
 Hamman Count 
 Hippity-Hop Kings 
 Homing Card, The
 Homing Card to Ter-ick-ific 
 Houdini Escapes 
 Interplay
 Invisible Card, The
 Jacks Come Back, The
 Kings Through The Table 
 Knavish Deuces, The
 Ladies Man, The
 Liar's Lie 
 Lie Detector Case, The
 Lolopolooza Hand, The
 Magic Box 
 Magic Cards, The
 Magician Matches Spectator 
 Magician Over Gambler 
 Marx Brothers, The
 Micro-Macro 
 Multiplying Kings, The
 My Lucky Day 
 Mystic Nine, The
 Old Classic, The
 Opposite Pockets 
 Out of Print 
 Peek Look Think 
 Pesky Card, The
 Phoenix Four 
 Pickpocket 
 Pinochle Trick, The
 Poker Palm Shift 
 Queens and Nines 
 Revenge on the Pink Panthers 
 Rook's Tour 
 Routines with Queens and Nines 
 Royal Gambol 
 Runic Nines 
 Sealed-Room Mystery 
 Second Deal 
 Seeing with the Fingertips 
 Seven O'clock Trick 
 Seven, The
 Signed Card, The
 Skipping Jacks 
 Spectator Outdeals 
 Magician ... Almost 
 Stun-sational 
 Tell-Tale Tongue 
 Thought Card in Case 
 Thought Cards Across 
 Three Guesses 
 Thunderstruck 
 Transparent Cards 
 Triple Cross 
 Triple Match 
 Twins, The
 Twisting Revisited 
 Two-Card Trick, The
 Two-Shuffles Harry 
 Underground Transposition
 Universal Card 
 Up the Down Sleeve 
 Vanishing Cream 
 Watch me like a Hawk 
 What and Where Test 
 Wild all the Way 
 Wild Card 
 Zarrow shuffle (Hamman's Version)

Bibliography

Videography

See also

Notes

References

External links 
Bro. John Hamman at MagicPedia

1927 births
2000 deaths
American magicians
Marianists
Gale College alumni
University of Dayton alumni
People from St. Louis
People from San Antonio
People from Trempealeau County, Wisconsin
Catholics from Texas
Catholics from Wisconsin
Catholics from Missouri